The 1998 Chicago Bears season was their 79th regular season completed in the National Football League (NFL). The team finished with a 4–12 record under head coach Dave Wannstedt. At the end of the season, Dave Wannstedt was fired and was replaced by Dick Jauron the following season.

Offseason

NFL draft

Staff

Roster

Regular season

Schedule 

Note: Intra-division opponents are in bold text.

Standings

References

External links 

 1998 Chicago Bears at Pro-Football-Reference.com

Chicago Bears
Chicago Bears seasons
Bear
1990s in Chicago
1998 in Illinois